Titanium nitrate is the inorganic compound with formula Ti(NO3)4. It is a colorless, diamagnetic solid that sublimes readily.  It is an unusual example of a volatile binary transition metal nitrate.   Ill defined species called titanium nitrate are produced upon dissolution of titanium or its oxides in nitric acid.

Preparation
Similarly to its original method,  Ti(NO3)4 is prepared by the nitration of titanium tetrachloride using  dinitrogen pentoxide or chlorine nitrate:
TiCl4  +   4 N2O5   →    Ti(NO3)4  +  4 ClNO2

Hydrated titanium nitrate, the nitrate salt of the aquo complex [Ti(H2O)6]3+, is produced upon dissolution of titanium compounds in nitric acid.

Structure
The complex has  D2d symmetry, with four bidentate nitrate ligands. The N-O distances are 1·29 Å and 1·185 Å (noncoordinated).

Physical properties
In the infrared spectrum, it absorbs strongly at 1635 cm−1, assigned to a N-O vibrational mode.

It is soluble in nonpolar solvents silicon tetrachloride and carbon tetrachloride.

Reactions
Titanium nitrate is hygroscopic, converting to ill-defined hydrates.  The anhydrous material is highly reactive, even toward hydrocarbons.  Titanium nitrate also reacts with n-dodecane, p-dichlorobenzene, anisole, biphenyl,

It decomposes thermally to titanium dioxide.

References

Other reading

Nitrates
Titanium(IV) compounds